Polish Australians refers to Australian citizens or residents of full or partial Polish ancestry, or Polish citizens living in Australia.

In 2006 52,254 Australian residents declared they were born in Poland. Cities with the largest Polish populations were Melbourne (16,439), Sydney (12,514), Adelaide (5,859) and Perth (5,142).

In 2021 45,884 Australian residents declared that they were born in Poland. The Australian states with the largest Polish populations were Victoria (14,202), New South Wales (13,830), and Queensland (5,740).

Since 2006 the Polish-born population has decreased by 6,370 people. Although the number of people declaring to have Polish ancestry has increased by 45,482 people from 163,802 in 2006 to 209,284 in 2021.

The Polish-born Australian resident population predominantly were Australian citizens (90.3%), Christian (82.4%) and used Polish at home (70.0%).  Around 78% arrived in Australia before 1990.

In 2006, 163,802 Australian residents declared they had Polish ancestry, either alone or in combination with one other ancestry. As of 2011, that number has jumped to 170,354.

Polish Australians are traditionally Catholic, as of 2021, 71.8% of those who nominated Polish as their language used at home identified as Catholic, down from 76% in 2016, the remainder either had no religious affiliation or followed another Christian religion. 0.5% followed Judaism, down from 1% in 2016.

History

The first Pole known to have arrived in Australia was Joseph Potaski, who was sent there as a convict from the United Kingdom of Great Britain and Ireland in 1803.

A prominent Pole, Paul Edmund Strzelecki arrived at Sydney on 25 April 1839. At the request of the governor of New South Wales, Sir George Gipps, Strzelecki made a geological and mineralogical survey of the Gippsland region in present-day eastern Victoria, where he made many discoveries including gold in 1839. That year, Strzelecki and a crew set out from Sydney on an expedition into the Australian Alps. In 1840, he climbed the highest peak on mainland Australia and named it Mount Kosciuszko. He reached Melbourne on 28 May 1840. From 1840 to 1842 Strzelecki explored Tasmania (then known as Van Diemen's Land). Having travelled 11,000 kilometres (7,000 miles) through New South Wales, Victoria and Tasmania, examining the geology along the way Strzelecki returned to England, where he was awarded in May 1846 the Founder's Medal of the Royal Geographical Society.

The first settlers from Poland arrived in South Australia in 1856 and settled in the Clare Valley region in a place later called Polish Hill River. The first mass migration happened in the late 1940s when large groups of displaced persons who could not return to communist Poland (the Polish People's Republic) migrated to Australia after World War II, including soldiers from the Polish Independent Carpathian Brigade. Between 1947 and 1954, the Poland-born population increased from 6,573 to 56,594 people.

In the early 1980s there was further Polish migration to Australia. The emergence of the Solidarity trade union movement and the declaration of martial law in Poland at the end of 1981 coincided with a further relaxation of Polish emigration laws. During the period 1980–1991 Australia granted permanent entry to a large number of Polish migrants, many arriving as refugees who soon got a reputation for being hard working. In 1991, an independent, voluntary organisation was established to inform the Australian public about issues related to Polish history, politics, society and culture. The immediate trigger for establishing the Australian Institute of Polish Affairs was strong public interest in the historic changes that swept Central Europe in 1989 and led to the collapse of communism. Some Australians have Polish-Jewish roots. They organised the Association of Polish Jews and Their Descendants. Both organisations are based in Melbourne.

Mount Kosciuszko, the highest mountain in Australia (not including its external territories), was named by the Polish explorer Count Paul Edmund Strzelecki in 1840, in honour of the Polish and American national hero and hero of the American Revolutionary War General Tadeusz Kościuszko, because Strzelecki perceived resemblance to the Kościuszko Mound in Kraków.

Melbourne
Melbourne, Victoria, has the largest Polish population in Australia which comprises a large part of the city's eclectic multicultural community. In 1986, the state of Victoria accounted for 36.4 percent of Australia's Polish-born population compared with 25.8 percent of the national population. A vast majority of these immigrants reside in Melbourne's south-east, in suburbs such as Bentleigh and Caulfield.

The largest portion of Melbourne's Polish population immigrated to the city after the Second World War, with the second largest influx occurring in the 1980s. However, Melbourne's Polish history goes back much further than the 1940s, with a Polish Relief Fund and a Polish Society both established in the city as early as 1863. A "Polish Festival @ Federation Square" has been yearly event there since 2004.

Organisations

Notable people

See also
 Australia–Poland relations
 Polish diaspora
 Immigration to Australia

References

External links 
 Australian Government, Community Information Summary, Poland-born
 Polish Community Council of Australia
A Dance to Remember, a video of the Wesole Nutki dance troup and Polish community in Melbourne on Culture Victoria
 Fitzgerald, M. and Debski, R. (2006). Internet Use of Polish by Polish Melburnians: Implications for Maintenance and Teaching. Language Learning and Technology, 10(1), 87-109. Retrieved 10 August 2006 from http://llt.msu.edu/vol10num1/fitzdebski/default.html .
 Origins portal:History of immigration from Poland

Immigration to Australia
 
European Australian